Thomas James Scotes (born January 6, 1932 Hagerstown, Maryland) was a career U.S. Foreign Service Officer and was the U.S. Ambassador to Yemen (1975-1978) and Chargé d'Affaires ad interim to Syria (Began June 16, 1974).  Since he retired, he's been a consultant and Vice President of the Hellenic American Union in Athens, Greece.

When he was nominated to be Ambassador, Scotes was considered a specialist on Arab affairs and was deputy chief of mission in Damascus.

Biography
Scotes grew up in Harrisburg, Pennsylvania and attended the Harrisburg public schools.  He earned an A.B. in History with honors from the University of Pennsylvania in 1953.

Publications
A Weft of Memory: A Greek Mother’s Recollection of Folksongs, Poems and Proverbs Aug 8, 2017

References

1932 births
Living people
Ambassadors of the United States to Yemen
People from Harrisburg, Pennsylvania
University of Pennsylvania alumni
Ambassadors of the United States to Syria